Suzanne DeLaurentiis is an American film producer and actress. She founded the Cinema City International Film Festival in 2007. She won the Hollywood F.A.M.E. Lifetime Achievement Award in 2008. She was born and raised in Burlington County, New Jersey.

Filmography

Producer
 My Lovely Bank (1982)
 Rocky V (1990)
 Mannequin Two: On the Move (1991)
 Mutant Man (1996)
 Pocket Ninjas (1997)
 The Vegas Connection (1999)
 Out of the Black (2001)
 A Month of Sundays (2001)
 Adjustments (2001)
 While You Were Waiting (2002)
 Jean Webster: The Mother Theresa of Atlantic City (2003)
 Shut Up and Kiss Me (2004)
 10th & Wolf (2006)
 I Believe in America (2007)
 Deceit (2009)
 New Hope Manor (2009)
 Area 407 (2012)
 How Sweet It Is (2014)

Actress
 Evil Judgment (1984)
 Breaking All the Rules (1985)
 Junior (1985)
 Mannequin Two: On the Move (1991)
 Dirt Merchant'' (1999)

References

Actresses from New Jersey
American film producers
American film actresses
Living people
American women film producers
Year of birth missing (living people)
21st-century American women